Statistics of Ekstraklasa for the 1983–84 season.

Overview
It was contested by 16 teams, and Lech Poznań won the championship.

League table

Results

Top goalscorers

References

External links
 Poland – List of final tables at RSSSF 

Ekstraklasa seasons
1983–84 in Polish football
Pol